Mighty Wind is a live album that was released to celebrate gospel musician Andrae Crouch's 40th year of recording gospel music. Crouch was able to get many well-known gospel singers to guest star on the project including Marvin Winans ("All Because of Jesus"), Karen Clark-Sheard ("Jesus Is Lord"), Fred Hammond ("Oh Give Thanks") and Crystal Lewis ("We Give You Glory").

Track listing
 "I Was Glad"
 "I Was Glad (reprise)"
 "All Because of Jesus"
 "All Because of Jesus (reprise)"
 "Jesus is Lord"
 "Bless the Lord"
 "Bless the Lord (reprise)"
 "O Give Thanks"
 "We Give You Glory"
 "Come Home"
 "Holy"
 "Thank You for Everything"
 "Yes Lord"
 "Mighty Wind"

Awards
In 2007, the album won a Dove Award for Traditional Gospel Album of the Year at the 38th GMA Dove Awards.

References

External links
 Short National Public Radio interview with Crouch about making of the album

2006 albums
Gospel albums by American artists
Andraé Crouch albums